Sutton Wick is a hamlet contiguous with the village of Drayton in Oxfordshire, England. It was part of Berkshire until the 1974 boundary changes transferred it to Oxfordshire.

Air crash

A Blackburn Beverley C.Mk 1 heavy transport aircraft on a flight from RAF Abingdon crashed at Sutton Wick on 5 March 1957. All but four of the 22 people aboard were killed in the accident, and two people were killed on the ground.

References

Hamlets in Oxfordshire